Abdelrahman Ossama Ahmed (born 7 October 1988, in Cairo) is an Egyptian taekwondo practitioner. He competed in the 80 kg event at the 2012 Summer Olympics and was eliminated in the preliminary round by Tommy Mollet.

Achievements
 1st Place in Frankfon World Cup 2007
 1st Place in Arab championship in Sharm El Sheikh (-80 kg) 2007
 5th Place in World Championship in China (-78 kg) 2007
 1st Place in African Games in Algeria (-78 kg) 2007
 1st Place in Arab Games in Egypt (-78 kg) 2007
 6th Place in World Taekwondo Qualification for the Beijing Olympic Games Manchester 2007 (-80 kg)
 4th Place in the World University Championship in Serbia (-84 kg) 2008
 2nd Place in Beijing Olympic Games (Test Event) (-80 kg) 2008
 1st Place in Arab Championship in Bahrain (-78 kg) 2009
 1st Place in Alexandria of the World Championships (-84 kg) 2009
 1st Place in Arab championship in Sharm El Sheikh (-80 kg) 2010
 2nd Place in African Championship in Libya (-80 kg) 2010
 Participate in World Championship in Korea (-80 kg) 2011
 5th Place in World Qualification for London Olympic Games in Baku (-80 kg) 2011
 1st Place in Egypt open Championship (-80 kg) 2011
 1st Place in African Games in Mozambique (-80 kg) 2011
 3rd Place in World University Championship in Korea (-80 kg) 2012
 2nd Place in Africa Qualification for London Olympic Games in Egypt (-80 kg) 2012

References

1988 births
Living people
Egyptian male taekwondo practitioners
Olympic taekwondo practitioners of Egypt
Taekwondo practitioners at the 2012 Summer Olympics
Sportspeople from Cairo
20th-century Egyptian people
21st-century Egyptian people